This was the first edition of the tournament, primarily organised due to the cancellation of some tournaments in 2021, due to the COVID-19 pandemic.

Ariel Behar and Gonzalo Escobar won the title, defeating Tomislav Brkić and Nikola Ćaćić in the final, 6–2, 6–4.

Seeds

Draw

Draw

References
Main Draw

Andalucía Open - Doubles
Andalucia Tennis Experience